Black Friday may refer to:

Events

Recurring days
 Black Friday (partying), the last Friday before Christmas in the United Kingdom
 Black Friday (shopping), the day following Thanksgiving in the United States
 Friday the 13th or Black Friday
 Good Friday or Black Friday, a Christian observance in commemoration of Jesus' crucifixion

Single days
 Black Friday (1869), the Fisk–Gould Scandal, a financial crisis in the United States
 Black Friday (1873), the crash of the Vienna Stock Exchange that precipitated the Panic of 1873
 Black Friday (1881), the Eyemouth disaster in which 189 fishermen died
 Haymarket affair (1887) (11 November 1887), four Chicago anarchists hanged, without evidence, for the deaths of seven police officers during a labor meeting, they were rehabilitated in 1893.
 Black Friday (1910), a day of police brutality on women's suffrage activists in England
 Black Friday (1916), October 20, a day in which a "perfect storm" hit Lake Erie in North America, sinking four ships
 Black Friday (1919), the Battle of George Square, a riot stemming from industrial unrest in Glasgow, Scotland
 Black Friday (1921), the announcement of British transport union leaders not to call for strike action against wage reductions for miners
 Italian invasion of Albania or Black Friday, the 1939 Italian invasion of Albania
 Black Friday (1939), a day of devastating bushfires in Victoria, Australia
 Black Friday (1944), a disastrous attack by the Black Watch (Royal Highland Regiment) of Canada near Woensdrecht during the Battle of the Scheldt
 Black Friday (1945), an Allied military operation during the Norwegian campaigns in World War II
 1950 Red River flood or Black Friday, a flood in Winnipeg, Manitoba, Canada
 Black Friday (1959), Cancellation of the CF-105 Arrow program and Orenda Iroquois program in Malton, Ontario, Canada
 Black Friday (1960), San Francisco City protest against the House Un-American Activities Committee
 Black Friday (1978), a massacre of protesters in Iran
 Viernes Negro (1983), the first major currency devaluation in Venezuela
 Edmonton tornado, referred to as Black Friday in the community for the 1987 day an F4 tornado struck Edmonton, Alberta, Canada
 1988 Hyderabad, Sindh massacre or Black Friday, a massacre of Mohajir civilians in Hyderabad, Sindh
 Black Friday (1993), a series of bomb explosions in Mumbai, India
 Black Friday (2004), a crackdown by government forces in Malé, Maldives, on peaceful protesters
 Black Friday (2005), an event in which tribal students were killed in Meghalaya, India
 United States v. Scheinberg, referred to as Black Friday in the poker community, the 2011 day when several online poker sites were seized
 Black Friday (2015), a string of terrorist attacks in France, Kuwait, Somalia, Syria and Tunisia

Films
 Black Friday (1916 film), an American feature film starring Dorothy Davenport and Emory Johnson
 Black Friday (1940 film), an American film starring Boris Karloff and Bela Lugosi
 Black Friday Incident, a 1993 screening of the first half of Toy Story for Disney executives resulting in a temporary production shutdown
 Black Friday (2002 film), action movie starring Gary Daniels
 Black Friday (2004 film), an Indian film about the 1993 Bombay bombings
 Black Friday, 2007 cable television movie directed by Arthur Allan Seidelman
 Black Friday, a 2009 Canadian short film starring Jeff Hammond
 Black Friday (2021 film), an American film directed by Casey Tebo

Literature
 Black Friday (Muchamore novel), a 2013 CHERUB novel by Robert Muchamore
 Black Friday (Patterson novel), a 1986 novel by James Patterson

Music

Albums
 Black Friday (Faderhead album) (2010)
 Black Friday (Indian Ocean album) (2005)
 Black Friday (Palehound album) (2019)

Mixtapes
 Black Friday (Jay Rock mixtape) (2010)
 Black Friday (Lil' Kim mixtape) (2011)
 Black Friday (Tony Yayo mixtape) (2008)

Songs
 Black Friday (Gwar single) (2016)
 "Black Friday", a Steely Dan song from their 1975 album Katy Lied
 "Black Friday", a 1998 song by Grinspoon from Pushing Buttons
 "Good Mourning/Black Friday", a 1986 song by Megadeth from Peace Sells... but Who's Buying?
 "Black Friday", a 2013 song by Stray from the Path from Anonymous

Television
 "Black Friday" (Scream Queens), a 2015 episode of Scream Queens
 "Black Friday" (South Park), a 2013 episode of South Park

Theatre
Black Friday (musical), a 2019 musical by StarKid Productions

Other uses
 1979 Revolution: Black Friday, a 2016 video game by iNK Stories

See also
 Bloody Friday (disambiguation)
 Black Monday
 List of Black Fridays

Black days